Diana Goetsch (born 1963) is an American poet and memoirist.

Life 
She graduated from Wesleyan University and New York University. She was a New York City public school teacher. She was the 2017 Grace Paley Teaching Fellow at Eugene Lang College of Liberal Arts. She was 2020 Visiting Writer at Vermont College of Fine Arts.  

She writes the “Life in Transition” blog at The American Scholar.

Her work appeared in Best American Poetry.

Works 

 This Body I Wore, Farrar, Straus and Giroux, 2022. 
 In America (Rattle, 2017)
 Nameless Boy (Orchises, 2015)
 The Job of Being Everybody (Cleveland State University Press, 2004)

References

External links 

 Official website
 Ann van Buren, Interview with Diana Goetsch,  2022 Katonah Poetry Series
 Diana Goetsch, This Body I Wore, GCL Book Club,  September 20, 2022

21st-century American poets
21st-century American women writers
American women poets
1963 births
Living people